Mount Zhuzi, also called Zhuzi Shan Qianfeng, is a mountain in Sanzhi District, New Taipei City, Taiwan. Located on the Tatun Volcano Group, it stands at 1,094 m, making it the tallest peak in the city.

References

Volcanoes of Taiwan
Zhuzi
Dormant volcanoes
Landforms of New Taipei